Lee Eugene Michaels (born Michael Olsen, November 24, 1945) is an American rock musician who sings and accompanies himself on organ, piano, or guitar.  He is best known for his powerful soulful voice and his energetic virtuosity on the Hammond organ, peaking in 1971 with his Top 10 pop hit single, "Do You Know What I Mean". In 1988 he founded the Marina Del Rey-based restaurant chain Killer Shrimp which he and his family continue to operate to this day.

Career
Born in Los Angeles, California, United States, Michaels began his career with The Sentinals, a San Luis Obispo, California-based surf group that included drummer Johny Barbata (later of The Turtles, Jefferson Airplane and Jefferson Starship). Michaels joined Barbata in the Joel Scott Hill Trio, a group led by guitarist Joel Scott Hill. Michaels later moved to San Francisco, where he joined an early version of The Family Tree, a band led by Bob Segarini. In 1967, he signed a contract with A&M Records, releasing his debut album, Carnival of Life, later that year with David Potter on drums. As a session musician, he played with Jimi Hendrix, among others.

Michaels' choice of the Hammond organ as his primary instrument was unusual for the time, as was his bare-bones stage and studio accompaniment:  usually just a single drummer, most often a musician known as "Frosty," real name Bartholomew Eugene Smith-Frost, who was a member of Sweathog, and whose barehanded technique was an inspiration for John Bonham, or with Joel Larson of The Grass Roots. This unorthodox approach attracted a following in San Francisco, and some critical notice. (Sounds Magazine, for one, reported of Michaels that he had been called "the ultimate power organist.") But Michaels did not achieve real commercial success until the release of his fifth album.

That album, titled 5th and released in 1971, produced a surprise US Top 10 hit (No. 6 in late 1971), "Do You Know What I Mean." It was an autobiographical homage to the loss of a girlfriend. Michaels's Top 40 follow-up, a cover version of the Motown standard, "Can I Get a Witness," peaked at No. 39 on Christmas Day 1971, eight years to the week after Marvin Gaye's version peaked at No. 22. Billboard ranked "Do You Know What I Mean" as the No. 19 song for 1971.  Michaels recorded two more albums for A&M before signing a recording contract with Columbia Records in 1973. But his Columbia recordings failed to generate much interest, and Michaels had gone into semi-retirement from the music industry by the end of the decade.

In 1991, Michaels obtained full rights to all of his A&M recordings in a settlement of disputes that had arisen from A&M granting licenses to Delicious Vinyl for the use of Michaels's recordings by means of digital sampling on several Young MC recordings. Once he had regained full ownership rights, Michaels granted licenses to Rhino Records and Shout Factory to release several "best of" albums over the years. Starting in November 2015, Manifesto Records has been re-releasing his entire catalog of A&M and Columbia recordings on compact disc and vinyl through to February 2016.

Discography

Studio albums + live album

Singles

Compilation CDs
 The Lee Michaels Collection (Rhino, 1992)	
 The Best of Lee Michaels (One Way, 1997)	
 Hello: The Very Best of Lee Michaels (Shout Factory, 2004)	
 Heighty Hi: The Best of Lee Michaels (Manifesto, 2015)	
 The Complete A&M Albums Collection [7-CD set] (Manifesto, 2015)

References

External links
 [ Lee Michaels Biography on allmusic.com]
 Lee Michaels MySpace tribute page
 Archive.org version of LeeMichaels.com (aka 'lee michaels personal web site') 2009-2015

1945 births
Living people
American rock singers
A&M Records artists
Columbia Records artists
ABC Records artists
American singer-songwriters
American rock keyboardists
American male organists
American rock pianists
American male pianists
American rock guitarists
American male guitarists
20th-century American guitarists
20th-century American pianists
21st-century American keyboardists
21st-century American pianists
21st-century organists
20th-century American male musicians
21st-century American male musicians
20th-century American keyboardists
American male singer-songwriters